Estación La Floresta is a suburb of La Floresta in the Canelones Department of Uruguay.

Location
The railroad track Montevideo - Punta del Este pass through this suburb.

Population
In 2011 Estación La Floresta had a population of 1,313.
 
Source: Instituto Nacional de Estadística de Uruguay

References

External links
INE map of Parque del Plata, La Floresta, Estación La Floresta, Costa Azul and Bello Horizonte

Populated places in the Canelones Department